This is a list of the judges of the Texas Supreme Court.

Justices of the Republic of Texas, 1836–1845 
The Constitution of the Republic of Texas provided for a Supreme Court to consist of a chief justice and associate justices.  The associate justices were the judges of the eight district courts of Texas. The district judges, whose first session was January 13, 1840, served with the chief justice as associate justices from January 13, 1840 to December 29, 1845, when Texas was admitted into the United States:

Succession of seats

Justices 1845 to 1876

Under the Constitutions of 1845 and 1861

Chief justices 
John Hemphill (March 1846 to October 1858)
Royall T. Wheeler (October 1858 to April 1864)
Oran M. Roberts (November 1864 to June 1866)

Associate justices 
Abner S. Lipscomb (March 1846 to November 1856)
Oran M. Roberts (April 1857 to October 1862)
George F. Moore (October 1862 to June 1866)
Royall T. Wheeler (March 1846 to October 1858)
James H. Bell (October 1858 to August 1864)
Reuben A. Reeves (November 1864 to June 1866)

Under the Constitution of 1866 (1866 to 1870) 
Removed by U.S. military authorities in 1867:
George F. Moore (Chief Justice, August 1866 to September 1867)
Richard Coke (August 1866 to September 1867)
S. P. Donley  (October 1866 to September 1867)
Asa H. Willie  (August 1866 to September 1867)
George W. Smith  (August 1866 to September 1867)

Appointed by U.S. military authorities to replace them:
Amos Morrill (Chief Justice, September 1867 to July 1870)
Livingston Lindsay (September 1867 to July 1870)
Albert H. Latimer (September 1867 to November 1869)
James Denison (January 1870 to July 1870)
Colbert Caldwell (September 1867 to October 1869)
Chauncey Brewer Sabin (March 1870, no record of service)
Andrew J. Hamilton (November 1867 to October 1869)
Moses B. Walker (December 1869 to July 1870)

Under the Constitution of 1868 (1870 to 1876) 
Three justices from July 5, 1870 to January 29, 1874
Lemuel D. Evans (Chief Justice, July 1870 to August 1873)
Wesley Ogden (July 1870 to August 1873; Chief Justice, August 1873 to January 1874)
Moses B. Walker (July 1870 to January 1874)
J. D. McAdoo (August 1873 to January 1874)

Five justices from January 29, 1874 to April 18, 1876
Oran M. Roberts (Chief Justice, January 1874 to April 1876)
Reuben A. Reeves (January 1874 to April 1876)
Thomas J. Devine (January 1874 to September 1875)
John Ireland (September 1875 to April 1876)
George F. Moore (February 1874 to April 1876)
William P. Ballinger (February 3, 1874, resigned same day)
Peter W. Gray (February 1874 to April 1876)
Robert S. Gould (May 1874 to April 1876)

Justices under the Constitution of 1876 (1876 to present)

Justices 1876 to 1945

Chief justices 

George F. Moore (November 1878 to November 1881)
Robert S. Gould (November 1881 to December 1882)
Asa H. Willie (December 1882 to March 1888)
John W. Stayton (March 1888 to July 1894)
Reuben R. Gaines (July 1894 to January 1911)
Thomas J. Brown (January 1911 to May 1915)
Nelson Phillips (June 1915 to November 1921)
Calvin Maples Cureton (December 1921 to April 1940)
W. F. Moore (April 1940 to January 1941)
James P. Alexander (January 1941 to 1948)
J. E. Hickman (1948 to 1961)
Robert W. Calvert (1961 to 1972)
Joe R. Greenhill (1972 to 1982)
Jack Pope (1982 to 1985)
John L. Hill Jr. (1985 to 1988)
Thomas R. Phillips (January 4, 1988 to January 2004)
Wallace B. Jefferson (January 2004 to October 1, 2013)
Nathan L. Hecht (October 1, 2013 to present; term ends on December 31, 2020)

Associate justices 
Robert S. Gould (April 1876 to November 1881)
John W. Stayton (November 1881 to March 1888)
A. S. Walker (April 1888 to January 1889)
J. L. Henry (January 1889 to May 1893)
Thomas J. Brown (May 1893 to January 1911)
William F. Ramsey (January 1911 to April 1912)
Nelson Phillips (April 1912 to June 1915)
J. E. Yantis (June 1915 to March 1918)
Thomas B. Greenwood (April 1918 to December 1934)
John H. Sharp (December 1934 to September 1945)

George F. Moore (April 1876 to October 1878)
Micajah H. Bonner (November 1878 to December 1882)
Charles S. West (December 1882 to September 1885)
Sawnie Robertson (October 1885 to September 1886)
Reuben R. Gaines (September 1886 to July 1894)
Leroy G. Denman (July 1894 to May 1899)
F. A. Williams (May 1899 to April 1911)
Joseph Burton Dibrell Jr. (April 1911 to January 1913)
William E. Hawkins (January 1913 to January 1921)
William Pierson (judge) (January 1921 to April 1935)
Richard Critz (May 1935 to January 1945)
Gordon Simpson (January 1945 to September 1949)

Justices from 1945

Chief Justice, Place 1 
James P. Alexander (September 21, 1945 to January 1, 1948)
J. E. Hickman (January 7, 1948 to January 3, 1961)
Robert W. Calvert (January 3, 1961 to October 4, 1972)
Joe R. Greenhill (October 4, 1972 to October 25, 1982)
Jack Pope (November 29, 1982 to January 4, 1985)
John L. Hill Jr. (January 5, 1985 to January 4, 1988)
Thomas R. Phillips (January 4, 1988 to September 3, 2004)
Wallace B. Jefferson (September 20, 2004 to October 1, 2013)
Nathan L. Hecht (October 1, 2013 to present; term ends on December 31, 2020)

Justices, Place 2 
John H. Sharp (September 21, 1945 to December 31, 1952)
Frank P. Culver Jr. (January 1, 1953 to December 21, 1964)
Jack Pope (January 4, 1965 to November 29, 1982)
Ted Z. Robertson (December 2, 1982 to December 31, 1988)
Lloyd Doggett (January 1, 1989 to December 31, 1994)
Priscilla R. Owen (January 1, 1995 to June 6, 2005. Appointed as a judge on the United States Court of Appeals for the Fifth Circuit.)
Don Willett (August 24, 2005 to January 2, 2018.  Appointed as a judge on the United States Court of Appeals for the Fifth Circuit.)
Jimmy Blacklock (January 2, 2018 to present. Term ends December 31, 2024.)

Justices, Place 3 
Gordon Simpson (September 21, 1945 to March 1, 1949)
R. H. Harvey (March 1, 1949 to September 8, 1950, died in office)
Robert W. Calvert (September 18, 1950 to January 3, 1961)
Zollie Steakley (January 3, 1961 to December 31, 1980)
James P. Wallace (January 1, 1981 to September 1, 1988)
Eugene A. Cook (September 1, 1988 to December 31, 1992)
Rose Spector (January 1, 1993 to December 31, 1998)
Harriet O'Neill (January 1, 1999 to June 20, 2010)
Debra Lehrmann (June 21, 2010 to present.  Term ends December 31, 2022.)

Justices, Place 4 
Graham B. Smedley (September 21, 1945 to June 16, 1954)
Ruel C. Walker (October 19, 1954 to September 30, 1975)
Ross E. Doughty (October 1, 1975 to December 31, 1976)
Don Yarbrough (January 1, 1977 to July 1977)
Charles W. Barrow (July 25, 1977 to September 30, 1984)
Raul A. Gonzalez (October 8, 1984 to December 31, 1998)
Alberto R. Gonzales (January 14, 1999 to December 22, 2000.  Resigned to become White House counsel to President George W. Bush.)
Wallace B. Jefferson (April 18, 2001 to September 20, 2004.  Appointed chief justice in September 2004.)
David M. Medina (November 10, 2004 to December 31, 2012)
John P. Devine (January 2013 to present. Term ends December 31, 2024.)

Justices, Place 5 
William M. Taylor (September 21, 1945 to December 31, 1950)
Will Wilson (January 2, 1951 to June 1, 1956)
Abner V. McCall (June 15, 1956 to December 31, 1956)
James R. Norvell (January 1, 1957 to October 10, 1968)
Thomas M. Reavley (October 10, 1968 to October 1, 1977)
T. C. Chadick (October 5, 1977 to December 31, 1978)
Robert M. Campbell (December 1, 1978 to February 1, 1988)
Barbara Culver (February 1, 1988 to December 7, 1988)
Jack English Hightower (December 7, 1988 to January 1, 1996)
Greg Abbott (January 2, 1996 to June 6, 2001)
Xavier Rodriguez (September 7, 2001 to November 6, 2002)
Steven Wayne Smith (November 20, 2002 to December 31, 2004)
Paul W. Green (January 1, 2005 to August 31, 2020)

Justices, Place 6 
J. E. Hickman (September 21, 1945 to January 5, 1948)
W. St. John Garwood (January 14, 1948 to December 31, 1958)
Robert W. Hamilton (January 1, 1959 to December 31, 1970)
James G. Denton (January 1, 1971 to June 10, 1982, died in office.)
Ruby Kless Sondock (June 25, 1982 to December 31, 1982)
William W. Kilgarlin (January 1, 1983 to December 31, 1988)
Nathan L. Hecht (January 1, 1989 to October 1, 2013)
Jeff Brown (October 3, 2013 to September 4, 2019)
Jane Bland (September 4, 2019 to present. Term expires December 31, 2020.)

Justices, Place 7 
C. S. Slatton (September 21, 1945 to October 1, 1947)
James P. Hart (October 1, 1947 to November 15, 1950)
Clyde E. Smith (November 15, 1950 to December 31, 1970)
Price Daniel (January 1, 1971 to December 31, 1978)
Franklin S. Spears (January 1, 1979 to December 31, 1990)
John Cornyn (January 2, 1991 to October 18, 1997)
Deborah Hankinson (October 28, 1997 to December 31, 2002)
Dale Wainwright (January 1, 2003 to September 30, 2012)
Jeffrey S. Boyd (December 3, 2012 to present. Term expires December 31, 2020.)

Justices, Place 8 
Few Brewster (September 21, 1945 to September 20, 1957)
Joe R. Greenhill (October 1, 1957 to October 4, 1972
Hawthorne Phillips (October 4, 1972 to December 31, 1972)
Sam Johnson (January 1, 1973 to October 16, 1979)
Will Garwood (November 15, 1979 to December 31, 1980)
C. L. Ray Jr. (November 25, 1980 to December 31, 1990)
Robert Gammage (January 1, 1991 to August 31, 1995)
James A. Baker (September 1, 1995 to August 31, 2002)
Michael H. Schneider (September 6, 2002 to September 20, 2004)
Phil Johnson (April 11, 2005 to December 31, 2018)
J. Brett Busby (March 20, 2019 to present. Term ends December 31, 2020)

Justices, Place 9 
A. J. Folley (September 21, 1945 to April 1, 1949)
Meade F. Griffin (April 1, 1949 to December 31, 1968)
Sears McGee (January 1, 1969 to December 31, 1986)
Oscar Mauzy (January 3, 1987 to December 31, 1993)
Craig T. Enoch (January 1, 1993 to October 1, 2003)
Scott A. Brister (November 21, 2003 to September 7, 2009)
Eva Guzman (October 8, 2009 to June 11, 2021)

References

Texas
Justices